Ian Peel (born 1972) is a British music journalist. He is most well known as founder of the magazines Classic Pop and Long Live Vinyl and as a writer with special interests in Eighties pop music, ZTT Records, 12" remixes and Paul McCartney.

He has written as a regular columnist for The Guardian, DJ Mag, Record Collector, net and Music Business International (sister publication of Music Week). His work has also appeared in The Times, BlackBook and Sound on Sound.

12" Remixes
Peel is a longstanding commentator on, and curator of, 12-inch single and remixes. He wrote Classic Pops Top 50 12"s of the Eighties special edition, and curated three volumes of the compilation series The Art of the 12". In 2016 he wrote the Afterword of Rob Grillo's book, Is That The 12" Remix?.

Peel used 12" remixes and rare edits to curate the soundtrack to In The AM, a film by The The. It was released as In The AM (Ian Peel Mix) as the closing track on The The's compilation album, Stretched, and as part of the group's box set, London Town 1983-1993.

According to the Penny Black music blog, "Most of the tracks on The Art of the 12” - which has been described by Peel on its cover as “150 minutes of blockbusters, rarities, vanities and mysteries” - have either never been released before on CD or sometimes at all."

ZTT Records, Trevor Horn and Sarm Studios
Peel has spent many years curating, archiving (and writing about) the work of ZTT Records, Trevor Horn and Sarm Studios. His work was profiled by The Word in 2010: "What Ian inherited was a ton of rotting cardboard boxes and a cataloguing nightmare," reported Andrew Harrison. "What he found, though, is dazzling to anyone who loves the work of Trevor Horn and the profligate madness of ZTT. With its antiquated floppies and hard discs the size (and weight) of lorry tyres, this room crystallises a pause between the old world of Take 1 and Take 2 and the future in which everything would be infinitely malleable."

Visiting Peel during the early stages of his work on the ZTT tape archive, DJ Food described the scene: "Nothing prepared me for the sight I saw upon stepping into the room. It was the whole downstairs floor of the building, the size of a small office or a very large living room. Boxes covered nearly every inch of floor space and were piled up to chest height, Ian had started to sort them into stacks relating to each artist and there was a small warren of footpaths between the piles. Half of the room was barely touched and the sheer volume of boxes was overwhelming."

His work has in this field has led to the release of more than 50 CD/vinyl releases, compilations, box sets and gallery exhibitions. In a piece titled Ian Peel’s One-Man Campaign Takes Another Brilliant Twist, Kris Needs wrote in Record Collector: "Considering that everything which ZTT touched during their early 80s purple patch immediately seemed to swell to widescreen proportions, it’s fortuitous that Ian Peel, though only a teenage record-buyer at the time, shares their panoramic visions when it comes to the reissue programme he’s been lovingly masterminding since last year. It seems he won’t rest until every reel from production supremo Trevor Horn’s archives has been distilled into one of his lavish double-disc sets, his accompanying sleevenotes always an invaluable source of facts and memorabilia."

Paul McCartney
Peel is a noted commentator on Paul McCartney's experimental oeuvre, as author of the 2002 biography The Unknown Paul McCartney, McCartney and the Avant-Garde and having participated in numerous TV and radio documentaries.

The Unknown Paul McCartney, McCartney and the Avant-Garde was described by BBC Music as an "engrossing round-up of the numerous side projects which have distracted Paul McCartney's active imagination over the last 35 years" and as "an odd and interesting re-framing of McCartney as experimentalist".

It is the only book to offer an in-depth history and analysis of McCartney's work in the field of experimental and avant-garde music, notably under the pseudonyms Thrillington and The Fireman, on projects such as Liverpool Sound Collage and Carnival of Light (with The Beatles), and as occasional collaborator with Allen Ginsberg, Brian Wilson and Yoko Ono. The foreword was written by David Toop.

One review commented that "Peel goes to lengths to put forward the argument that though the seemingly 'constantly cheerful one' may have been responsible for the MOR apocalypse of Wings, experimentation in other genres was never far away." Another noted that "Although Peel spends much of the book setting stages, discussing Cage, Eno, IDM and so on, who else would even have dreamt up such a thesis?"

While McCartney was not directly involved in the biography, The Guardian remarked in 2007 that "His implicit approval... suggested an attempt to correct a misperception."

Bibliography
As author:

Music & The Internet, Future plc, 1996
The Unknown Paul McCartney – McCartney and the Avant-garde, with foreword by David Toop, Reynolds & Hearn/Titan Books, 2002
The Rough Guide to eBay, Penguin Random House, 2006
Stiff Records - The Big Stiff Book, Union Square Music, 2007
Zang Tuum Tumb - The ZTT Records Story, with foreword by Paul Morley, Union Square Music, 2008
The Rough Guide to Saving & Selling Online (Penguin Random House, 2010)

As contributor:

Is That The 12" Remix? (afterword), Bank House, 2016
The Virgin Encyclopedia Of Popular Music, Virgin Books, 2002
The New Grove Dictionary of Music and Musicians, Oxford University Press, 2001
The Rough Guide To Rock, Penguin Random House, 1998
The Complete Introduction to Record Collecting, Verulam Publishing, 1995
Microsoft Music Central, Microsoft, 1995
Guinness Encyclopedia Of Popular Music, Guinness Publishing, 1992

Discography (Liner notes)
Landscape - From the Tea-rooms of Mars .... (Record Store Day 2023 Edition) (2023)
The Psychedelic Furs - The Best Of (2021)
Art Of Noise - Noise In The City (Live in Tokyo, 1986) (2021)	
Art Of Noise - Who's Afraid of the Art of Noise? (Record Store Day special edition) (2021)	
Art Of Noise/Art & ACT - Daft as a Brush! (2019)
Propaganda - The Eight Testaments of Propaganda (2019)		
808 State - The Four States of 808 (2019)
Art Of Noise - In No Sense? Nonsense! (Deluxe Edition) (2018)
Frankie Goes To Hollywood - The First 48 Inches of Frankie Goes To Hollywood (2018)
Propaganda - A Secret Wish (Art of the Album Edition) (2017)
Frankie Goes To Hollywood - Welcome To The Pleasuredome (Art of the Album Edition) (2017)
Trevor Horn - The Reflection (2017)
Anne Dudley - Anne Dudley Plays the Art of Noise (2017)
Art Of Noise - In Visible Silence (Deluxe Edition) (2017)
Thompson Twins - Hold Me Now, The Very Best of Thompson Twins (2016)
Various Artists - The Value Of Entertainment (2015)
Anne Pigalle - Everything Could Be So Perfect, Édition Deluxe (2015)
Act - Love & Hate, A Compact Introduction To Act (2015)
Art Of Noise - At The End Of A Century (2015)
Lisa Stansfield - The Moment (2015)
Various Artists - Rewind, The 80s Album (2014)
Frankie Goes To Hollywood - Inside The Pleasuredome box set (2014)	
Various Artists - The Art Of The 12", Volume Three: A Soundtrack For Living (2014)
Various Artists - The Re-Organization Of Pop box set (2014)
Various Artists - Zambient One (2013)
Various Artists - The Organization Of Pop (2013)
Frankie Goes To Hollywood - Frankie Said (2012)
Frankie Goes To Hollywood - Sex Mix, Archive Tapes And Studio Adventures (2012)
Various Artists - The Art Of The 12", Volume Two: A Promotion Of A Way Of Life (2012)		
Propaganda - Noise And Girls Come Out To Play, A Compact Introduction To Propaganda (2012)
Propaganda - Wishful Thinking (Is Disturbdances Of Five Songs) (2012)		
Art Of Noise - Who's Afraid of the Art of Noise? (25th anniversary edition) (2011)		
Various Artists - The Art Of The 12", Volume One: A Celebration Of The Extended Remix (2011)
Art Of Noise - Into Battle with the Art of Noise (25th anniversary edition) (2011)		
Paul Rutherford - Oh World (2011)
Claudia Brücken - ComBined (2011)
Frankie Goes To Hollywood - Liverpool (2011)
808 State - Blueprint (2011)
Shades of Rhythm - Shades Of Rhythm, Extacy Edition (2010)		
Claudia Brücken - Love: And A Million Other Things (2010)
Frankie Goes To Hollywood - Welcome To The Pleasuredome (2010)
Art Of Noise - Influence (2010)
Buggles - Adventures In Modern Recording, 2.0 (2010)
Propaganda - A Secret Wish (2010)
808 State - Don Solaris, 808 Archives Vol. 4 (2008)
808 State - Gorgeous, 808 Archives Vol. 3 (2008)
808 State - ex:el, 808 Archives Vol. 2 (ZTT, 2008)
808 State - 808:90, 808 Archives Vol. 1 (ZTT, 2008)
Various Artists - Zang Tumb Tuum, The ZTT Box Set (2008)
Various Artists - The Big Stiff Box Set (2007)
Art Of Noise - And What Have You Done with My Body, God? box set (2006)
Andrew Poppy - On Zang Tuum Tumb box set (2005)
Various Artists - The Abduction Of The Art Of Noise (2004)

References

British journalists
1972 births
Living people